"Ciao, 2020!" is the New Year's edition of the Evening Urgant program, aired on Channel One on December 30, 2020.

The release parodies the holiday concerts of the Italian pop music of the 1980's and the tradition of the Soviet, and later Russian, Blue Lights (airing on rival VGTRK). All participants in the program, presenters and performers, have stylized Italian names and pseudonyms. Communication takes place in Italian and is accompanied by Russian subtitles.

The YouTube version of the show has been featured in many Italian media outlets. In four days, the video had been viewed 4.5 million times.

Production 
The show, hosted by Ivan Urgant as Giovanni Urgant, is a parody of the traditional Soviet and later Russian TV show 'Blue Lights' through the reconstruction of popular Italian music programs of the 1980's such as 'Drive In,' 'Popcorn' and 'Discoring.' According to Urgant, the film crew was guided by their own feeling from the old Italian music festivals as the artists changed [songs] with pleasure and sang in Italian'. The choice of Italy as an object of parody is associated with the popularity of Italian pop music in Russia in the last decades of the USSR, particularly thanks to the Sanremo Music Festival. The artists associated with him continued to give concerts in Russia and perform at retro festivals decades after the collapse of the USSR, and similar combined concerts were rebroadcast on Russian TV channels during the New Years period.

The program reinterprets the dance moves and musical sound that were popular in Italy at that time, the design, such as fonts specific to the 1980s and neon lamps, and the Italian fashion of the time, including a mustache, baggy clothes and long hair for men as well as shoulder pads, leggings, high hairstyles, flashy clothes, sequins, Lurex and animal prints. Musical numbers are interspersed with sketches, as a rule. Sketches include interviews of the presenter with fictitious famous people, whose actions and remarks are written into the script. The directorial techniques of Italian programs of the time are also imitated, such as shots with guests dancing in front of the camera while the artists perform their song on stage. All songs played in the program, with the exception of the techno remake of the song 'Mamma Maria' by Ricchi e Poveri, are adaptations of popular hits by the artists who took part in the recording of the program and traditional Russian New Year's songs. The song lyrics are all translated into Italian and stylized as a typical sound for an Italian stage of the time period from the mid-1970's to the early 1990's. References to Italian popular culture are not limited to music programs and festivals of the past. For example, the number 'Credo' is inspired by the film 'The Taming Of The Scoundrel', the lyrics of some songs contain references to places, people and events that were relevant at the time of the release of the program. Examples of this are demonstrated in the song 'Piango al Tecno' the street Kuznetsky Most, and Russian DJ Nina Kravitz are mentioned. During a commercial break announced by the host, viewers see a skit for a fictitious cleaning product called Buono. The finale of the program uses an original excerpt from the Soviet film 'Irony of Fate, or Enjoy Your Bath!' but the creators of the film dubbed the scene in Italian. Since the program was created for the Russian market, many jokes remain incomprehensible to Italian speakers. The program also contains references to current Russian events and Russian culture at the time of release. Although the interviews with the participants are staged, they often play on real topics from the personal lives or careers of the performers, for example, the actresses in the spoof TV series 'Quattro Putane' are actresses of the Russian TV series 'Chiki' that is about the lives of prostitutes. Some of the jokes are based on the peculiarities of the sound of Italian words for Russian-speaking people. Also, the artists speak with a strong accent and mispronounce many words.

On 26 February 2021, the Warner Music Russia label released the album 'CIAO 2020', which included 12 tracks.

On 25 June 2021, in the final episode of the program, Vittorio Saltichieri's 'Notte Bianca' video was shown, filmed in St. Petersburg during the white nights in the style of 'Ciao, 2020!'. the original song is a composition performed by Viktor Saltykov 'White Night' and the clip also contains references to the movie 'The Incredible Adventures of Italians in Russia'

Plot 
The transfer begins with the appeal of Ivan Urgant, who is in the editing room of the Evening Urgant. He reveals that the production team made the decision not to shoot the New Year's special, as due to events related to the COVID-19 pandemic, they will have 'no desire, no mood and no strength'. Instead he reports that the audience will be shown the Italian New Year's music show 'Ciao, 2020!'.

After the introduction, the first musical number begins, called 'Cinque minuti', which is performed by the host Giovanni Urganti (played by Urgant) and the group 'Tutti Frutti'. The host announces the names of celebrities who are participating in the episode, and the audience is shown cards with greetings on them. Urganti introduces his co-hosts Matteo Crustaldi, Alessandro Gudini and Allegra Michele, who appear on stage with him. The following descriptions are the various skits and interviews throughout this episode.

Next comes the number 'Crush' by Claudia Cocchi and Niletto Niletti, the latter appearing on stage in roller skates.  The program continues with an interview with porn director Alessandro Pallini, who on the screen of the video camera shows the presenter a fragment from his new film, at the sight of which Urganti becomes delighted, exclaiming “Fantastic! Film without women! Only men!”, he calls the film crew to watch the clip with him and Pallini.

Next, Joni performs the song "La Cometa" in front of a huge screen, on which close-ups of the artist are mixed with shots of the starry sky. Urganti and Crustaldi interview Ornella Buzzi, after which the duo of Arti and Asti perform the song "Bambina balla", moving around the stage on an illuminated crescent moon decoration. Then Gudini interviews Milanka and Gerolomo Paffuto.

The Crema de la Soda group performs the song "Piango al Tecno" with a backup dancers consisting of a gladiator, a player from the Turin Juventus, a dancer in a white cassock dressed as Pius XIII from the TV series "The Young Pope", Donatella Versace 's double, a Swiss guard, and dancers dressed as Madonna from the cover of the Like a Virgin album.

Urganti and Michele raffle lotto prizes among the spectators along with Gigi. Dora sings "Innamorata" followed by a commercial for "Buono" cleaner, in which Crustaldi, dressed as Santa Claus, finds his wife (played by Allegra Michele) in bed with another man, after which she invites Crustaldi's character to join them, which he does.

Urganti interviews Nicola Basca and Daniele Milocchi, who then sing the song "La Baldoria". Urganti interviews the group "Tutti Frutti", after which Giorgio Creddi performs the song "Ragazza copertina". Urganti interviews the actresses of the Quattro putane series: Barbara Cinicchio, Elenuccia Michelucci and Irene Nosa. The host asks where the fourth actress (a reference to the name of the series, "quattro" from the Italian "four"), Irene Gorbachetti, to which he receives the answer "She works!" After that, the actresses compete in swallowing spaghetti with Alessandro Gudini, and Giovanni Dorni, with a ballet in robot costumes, performs a number for the song "Cicchi", which is the soundtrack to the series.

Urganti and Gudini interview Ida Galicci, after which Giulia Ziverti performs the song "Credo". Urganti interviews Enrico Carlacci. The group "Piccolo Grandi" performs the song "Mamma Maria", after which Gudini presents them with a diploma for winning the Eurovision Song Contest.

The program reaches its grand finale when Pope Pippo II appears on the stage, sanctioning the beginning of the New Year by lighting the lights on the tree with an extension cord. At the end, Urganti, Soldinetta and Vittorio Isaiah sing the song "Chiesi io al frassino" and the participants of the program make New Year's wishes to the audience.

Popularity 
Posted on the Evening Urgant YouTube channel, "Ciao 2020!" trended in both Russia and Italy. On 5 January 2021, the video became the most watched video of the moment on the Italian side of YouTube. The video was a viral success in Italy. According to Italian media reports, "Ciao 2020!" became one of the most discussed topics of the beginning of 2021 among Italian-speaking users of social networks and instant messengers. Editorial staff of the TgCom24 TV channel website called the video a 'phenomenon', comparing references to the show in the early days to an avalanche. Discussion of the program hit the trends of Italian segments of Twitter. For Italians, the video became a source of memes in the form of screenshots, videos and character quotes. Some of those who performed in the video gained independent popularity on social media among Italians, especially the number 'Piagno al tecno'.

After the release of 'Evening Urgant' from the winter holidays on 29 January 2021, an episode was aired in which 'Ciao, 2020!' was discussed with Italian Ambassador to Russia Pasquale Terracciano.

Reviews

In Russian media 
In the Russian media, the program was mainly discussed in the context of its popularity in Italy and the reaction of Italians to the program, according to Rossiyskaya Gazeta. Many other publications noted that the program continues the Russian tradition of New Year's TV shows in a retro style, which began with the 1994 New Year's Karaoke program on the NTV Channel, authored and hosted by Leonid Parfenov, and the most famous example of this tradition is a series of telemusicals 'Old songs about the main thing'. Karmunin saw escapism in this trend, and the desire of the audience to escape from modern realities. Journalist Ana Mongait supported him in this, linking the appearance of such a program with the fear of the future by modern man and saying that 'there is no strategic plan for what can happen tomorrow'. The musical portal, The Flow, positively evaluated 'piercing pop version' of the song 'I'm in love', as well as remixes of 'Crying for Techno' and 'Mamma Maria' presented in the program. Among the sketches, the editors especially noted the number with Dzhugan in the role of Gigi. According to music critic Anton Vagin, expressed in his article on the musical results of 2020 on 'Afisha Daily', participation in the program of Dani Milokhin 'legitimized TikTok-pop for everyone'.

In Italian media 
Rosalba Casteletti of la Repubblica called "Ciao, 2020!" 'A comedic masterpiece' and 'a grotesque satire, but above all great declaration of love for Italy'. The Italian tabloid website Dagospia called the show 'the only real Italian New Year's celebration on TV'. The Italian Huffington Post called the show 'a masterpiece of trash'. Cristiano Sala of Il Messaggero wrote that the stereotypes of television of the past in 'Ciao, 2020!' were turned into 'creative gems', calling the program 'one of the funniest shows of recent years in Italian' and 'a wonderful message that brought people together during a forced separation'.

Ciao, 2021! 
On 1 January 2022, the continuation of the project, called "Ciao, 2021!" was released on Channel One.

At the end of the program, Vladimir Putin's New Year's greeting in Italian is shown (created by a neural network) against the backdrop of the Colosseum. The second program was also highly reviewed by the Italian media.

Song list

Cast

References 

2020 films
Russian parody films